Silent Family is a German aircraft manufacturer based in Westerrade and owned by Helmut Grossklaus. The company specializes in the design and manufacture of ultralight trikes.

The company's first product, the Silent Glider M is described as "very original" by Bertrand et al. It takes a rigid wing hang glider and adds a pod fuselage, with a bubble canopy to transform the aircraft into an enclosed cockpit, retractable landing gear-equipped ultralight motor glider.

The Silent Racer is a similar concept, but an open-cockpit, powered podded fuselage that uses a conventional flexible hang glider wing.

Aircraft

References

External links

Aircraft manufacturers of Germany
Ultralight trikes